Ellipsoid Hill is a rounded, partly ice-covered summit,  high, to the north of Blue Glacier, between Geoid Glacier and Spheroid Hill, in Victoria Land, Antarctica. The name is one of a group in the area associated with surveying applied in 1993 by the New Zealand Geographic Board, and is for ellipsoid, in geodesy a mathematical figure formed by revolving an ellipse about its minor axis.

References 

Hills of Victoria Land
Scott Coast